This list of fossil reptiles described in 2020 is a list of new taxa of fossil reptiles that were described during the year 2020, as well as other significant discoveries and events related to reptile paleontology that occurred in 2020.

Lizards and snakes

New taxa

Research
 New fossil material of squamates is described from the Upper Cretaceous Fruitland and Kirtland formations (New Mexico, United States) by Woolley, Smith & Sertich (2020), expanding known taxonomic and morphological diversity of lizards within the "Hunter Wash Local Fauna".
 A study on the affinities of putative gekkotan eggshells from the Late Cretaceous of Europe is published by Choi et al. (2020), who interpret the fossil material of Pseudogeckoolithus as theropod eggshells.
 Fossils of tupinambine teiids are described from the late Eocene of the Quercy Phosphorites Formation (France) by Louis & Santiago (2020), representing the first record of this family from the Paleogene of Europe.
 A dentary of a cnemidophorine teiid is described from the Miocene of the Ogallala Group (Nebraska, United States) by Scarpetta (2020), who evaluates the implications of this specimen for the knowledge of the evolutionary history of cnemidophorines in North America during the Neogene.
 The first known fossil example of an iguana nesting burrow is reported from the Pleistocene Grotto Beach Formation (The Bahamas) by Martin et al. (2020).
 A study on the anatomy of the skull of Ophisaurus acuminatus, and on the taxonomic validity of this species, is published by Klembara & Čerňanský (2020).
 Fossil material of the monitor lizards is reported for the first time from the late Miocene localities in Armenia and Georgia by Vasilyan & Bukhsianidze (2020).
 A study on the evolutionary history of mosasauroids, comparing their evolutionary rates and traits to those of plesiosaurs and aiming to determine whether the rise and diversification of mosasauroids was influenced by competition with or disappearance of some plesiosaur taxa, is published by Madzia & Cau (2020).
 Grigoriev & Grabovskiy (2020) describe new fossil material of a tylosaurine from the Upper Cretaceous (Turonian) of the Chukotka Region (Russia), representing one of the oldest and northernmost mosasaur records reported so far, and evaluate the implications of this fossil material (as well as mosasaur fossils from the Santonian of the Komi Republic and from the Campanian–Maastrichtian of the Sakhalin Island) for the knowledge of the paleogeography and possible migrations of Arctic mosasaurs.
 A study on pathological features of a specimen of Prognathodon (belonging or related to the species P. sectorius) from the Maastrichtian Gulpen Formation (the Netherlands) is published by Bastiaans et al. (2020), who consider it most likely that this specimen was bitten in the snout by a large, possibly conspecific mosasaur, making it one of the few specimens with unambiguous evidence of agonistic interactions amongst mosasaurs.
 A study on the morphology of the snout of Taniwhasaurus antarcticus, indicating the presence of a complex internal neurovascular system of branched channels similar to systems present in extant aquatic vertebrates such as cetaceans and crocodiles, is published by Álvarez–Herrera, Agnolin & Novas (2020).
 Zietlow (2020) recovers growth series of Tylosaurus proriger and T. nepaeolicus, and tests the hypothesis that T. kansasensis represent juveniles of T. nepaeolicus.
 Redescription of Palaeophis oweni is published by Georgalis, Del Favero & Delfino (2020).
 Eocene snake vertebrae from Landana and Sassa-Zao (Angola), originally referred to Palaeophis aff. typhaeus, are assigned to the species Palaeophis africanus by Folie et al. (2020), who interpret these fossils as confirming the aquatic capabilities of palaeophiid snakes, and evaluate the implications of these fossils for the debate on the existence of primitive and advanced grades among palaeophiid snakes.
 New information on the anatomy of the Eocene fossil boas Messelophis variatus and Rieppelophis ermannorum, based on data from new specimens from the Messel pit (Germany), is presented by Scanferla & Smith (2020).
 Description of new fossil material of Thaumastophis missiaeni from the Eocene Cambay Shale (India) and a study on the phylogenetic relationships of this snake is published by Zaher et al. (2020), who name a new family Thaumastophiidae.

Ichthyosauromorphs

New taxa

Research
 Partial trunk region of the largest hupehsuchian reported so far is described from the Early Triassic of Hubei, China by Qiao, Iijima & Liu (2020), who interpret this specimen as evidence of early establishment of high predation pressure in the sea after the Permian–Triassic extinction event and before the Middle Triassic.
 New anatomical features of the holotype specimen of Cartorhynchus lenticarpus revealed by CT scanning, including unique dentition, are reported by Huang et al. (2020), who evaluate the implications of this species for the knowledge of the evolution of tooth morphology and diet in basal ichthyosauriforms.
 A caudal vertebra of a basal ichthyosauriform similar to grippidians, representing the youngest record of basal ichthyosauriforms to date, is described from the Middle Triassic (Ladinian) of Mallorca (Spain) by Matamales-Andreu et al. (2020).
 A study on the age of the fossils of Thaisaurus chonglakmanii is published by Tongtherm et al. (2020).
 A study on the tempo and mode of the morphological evolution of ichthyosaurs is published by Moon & Stubbs (2020).
 A study on skeletal pathologies in ichthyosaur specimens from the Middle Triassic Besano Formation and the Lower Jurassic Posidonia Shale, evaluating their implications for the knowledge of changing locomotory and behavioural constraints affecting different ichthyosaur taxa through time, is published by Pardo-Pérez, Kear & Maxwell (2020).
 Two new specimens of Mixosaurus cornalianus, preserving evidence of the presence of a dorsal fin and a well-developed, triangular dorsal lobe of the caudal fin in this species, are described from the Anisian Besano Formation (Italy) by Renesto et al. (2020).
 Jiang et al. (2020) report the discovery of remains of a thalattosaur belonging to the genus Xinpusaurus in the abdominal region of a specimen of Guizhouichthyosaurus from the Middle Triassic (Ladinian) Zhuganpo Member of the Falang Formation (China), and interpret this finding as likely the oldest evidence for predation on megafauna by marine tetrapods reported so far.
 A study on the anatomy of the holotype specimen of Temnodontosaurus crassimanus is published by Swaby & Lomax (2020), who consider T. crassimanus to be a valid species.
 Description of the most complete and best-preserved skeleton of Suevoleviathan integer is published by Maisch (2020).
 Partial skeleton of an ophthalmosaurid ichthyosaur, found with an ichthyosaur tooth (probably not belonging to the same specimen) stuck on its rib, is described from the Upper Jurassic Rosso Ammonitico Veronese Formation (Italy) by Serafini et al. (2020), possibly representing the first evidence of scavenging between two ichthyosaurs reported so far.
 A study on the anatomy and phylogenetic relationships of Maiaspondylus lindoei, "Ophthalmosaurus" cantabrigiensis and "Platypterygius" ochevi is published by Zverkov & Grigoriev (2020), who transfer "O". cantabrigiensis to the genus Maiaspondylus, and consider "P. ochevi to be a junior synonym of M. cantabrigiensis.
 Description of a new specimen of Muiscasaurus catheti from the Aptian Paja Formation (Colombia), providing new information on the anatomy of this taxon, and a study on the phylogenetic relationships of M. catheti is published by Páramo-Fonseca et al. (2020).

Sauropterygians

New taxa

Research
 A study on the osteology and evolution of the temporal region of the skull of placodonts is published by Maisch et al. (2020).
 A study on the anatomy of the skull and braincase of Parahenodus atancensis, and on the anatomy of the reconstructed brain, inner ear and neurosensory structures of this taxon, is published by De Miguel Chaves et al. (2020).
 New fossil material of Lariosaurus sanxiaensis is described from the Lower Triassic Jialingjiang Formation (China) by Li & Liu (2020), who also study the phylogenetic relationships of this taxon, as well as the predator-prey relationship in the associated fauna and their implications for the knowledge of the biotic recovery after the Permian–Triassic extinction event.
 New fossil material of cryptoclidid plesiosaurs, including the first occurrence of Vinialesaurus in the Southern Hemisphere, is described from the Jurassic of the Atacama Desert by Otero et al. (2020).
 Redescription of the holotype specimen of Aphrosaurus furlongi and a study on the evolution and phylogenetic relationships of elasmosaurid plesiosaurs is published by O’Gorman (2020), who names a new clade Euelasmosaurida.
 The first non-aristonectine elasmosaurid skeleton from Antarctica that preserves an associated lower jaw is described by O’Gorman et al. (2020).
 An isolated cervical centrum of a brachauchenine pliosaurid is described from the Cenomanian of Russia by Zverkov & Pervushov (2020), who interpret this fossil as belonging to one of the largest known pliosaurids, and consider it to be evidence of survival gigantic pliosaurids into the Cenomanian.
 A study on the evolution of the short-necked plesiosaurs throughout the Jurassic and Cretaceous periods is published by Fischer et al. (2020).

Turtles

New taxa

Research
 A study on the evolution of turtle skull architecture, aiming to assess the functional significance of changes in their skull architecture during feeding on the basis of data from extant and fossil taxa, is published by Ferreira et al. (2020).
 A study on the relation between ecology and shell shape in extant turtles, and its implications for the knowledge of the ecology of fossil turtles, is published by Dziomber, Joyce & Foth (2020).
 A study on the early evolution of turtles during the Triassic period is published by de la Fuente, Sterli & Krapovickas (2020).
 A study on non‐marine turtle distribution and diversity from the Late Triassic to the Paleogene is published by Cleary et al. (2020).
 Szczygielski (2020) revises the first described Triassic turtle Chelytherium obscurum, and considers it to be synonymous with Proterochersis robusta.
 Description of new fossil material of Indochelys spatulata from the Jurassic Kota Formation (India), and a study on the anatomy and phylogenetic relationships of this taxon, is published by Joyce & Bandyopadhyay (2020).
 The first three-dimensional reconstruction of the skull of Kallokibotion bajazidi is presented by Martín-Jiménez, Codrea & Pérez-García (2020).
 Fossil material of an indeterminate member of Pelomedusoides is described from the Valanginian Rosablanca Formation (Colombia) by Cadena (2020), who interprets this finding as additional evidence supporting the occurrence of Pelomedusoides during the Valanginian in northern South America.
 New specimens of Araripemys barretoi, providing new information on the morphological variation within this species, are described from the Crato Formation and Romualdo Formation (Brazil) by Limaverde et al. (2020).
 A study on the histology of the shell of Cearachelys placidoi is published by Sena et al. (2020).
 New fossil material of Cordichelys is described from the Eocene Birket Qarun Formation and Qasr el Sagha Formation (Egypt) by Cherney et al. (2020), who evaluate the implications of these fossils for the knowledge of the morphological variation within the genus Cordichelys, its ecology and the relationship between Cordichelys and Stereogenys.
 Cadena et al. (2020) describe new fossil material of Stupendemys geographicus from the Miocene of Venezuela and Colombia, providing new information on the anatomy and paleobiology of this species.
 Peltochelys duchastelii is reinterpreted as a member of Paracryptodira by Joyce & Rollot (2020).
 Description of the anatomy of the skull of Pleurosternon bullockii is published by Evers, Rollot & Joyce (2020).
 Redescription of the anatomy of the skull and mandible of Sandownia harrisi is published by Evers & Joyce (2020).
 New information on the anatomy and stratigraphic and geographic distribution of Anosteira pulchra is presented by Adrian et al. (2020).
 A revision of the extinct geoemydid Echmatemys from North America, based mainly on data from a slab containing several turtle shells collected from the Bridgerian of Levett Creek (Wyoming, United States), is published by Vlachos (2020).
 A study on the phylogenetic relationships of a putative testudinoid Cardichelyon rogerwoodi is published by Joyce & Claude (2020), who consider it more likely that this taxon is a member of Kinosternoidea.
 Fossil remains of dermochelyid turtles representing the first confidently identified multispecies assemblage of dermochelyids are described from the Oligocene Chandler Bridge and Ashley formations (South Carolina, United States) by Fallon & Boessenecker (2020).

Archosauriformes

Archosaurs

Other archosauriforms

New taxa

Research
 New Early Triassic archosauriform track assemblage is described from the Gardetta Plateau (Western Alps, Italy) by Petti et al. (2020), who interpret this finding as evidence of the presence of archosauriforms at low latitudes soon after the Permian–Triassic extinction event, and name a new ichnotaxon Isochirotherium gardettensis.
 Postcranial material of an erythrosuchid from the Rassypnaya locality (Olenekian; Orenburg Oblast, Russia), previously referred to Vjushkovia triplicostata, is referred to the species Garjainia prima by Maidment et al. (2020), who evalue the implications of this fossil material for the knowledge of the phylogenetic relationships, body mass and locomotor musculature of erythrosuchids.
 Redescription of the anatomy of the holotype specimen of Chanaresuchus bonapartei and a study on the phylogenetic relationships of this species is published by Trotteyn & Ezcurra (2020).
 Redescription of the anatomy of the skull and mandible of Euparkeria capensis is published Sookias et al. (2020).
 A study on the joint mobility of the hindlimb of Euparkeria capensis, and on its implications for the knowledge of the evolution of the locomotor capabilities of archosaurs, is published by Demuth, Rayfield & Hutchinson (2020).
 Phytosaur remains are described from the Upper Triassic Upper Karoo Group (Zimbabwe) by Barrett et al. (2020), representing the first record of members of this group from sub-Saharan Africa.
 An assemblage of at least 21 phytosaur specimens dominated by juveniles and subadults is described from the Upper Triassic Tiki Formation (India) by Datta, Mukherjee & Ray (2020), who interpret this finding as likely evidence of parental care in phytosaurs, and study the taphonomy of the assemblage.
 A study on the evolution of the skull shape in phytosaurs is published by Datta, Sharma & Ray (2020).
 A study comparing teeth microwear textures in Machaeroprosopus pristinus, Mystriosuchus planirostris, Nicrosaurus kapffi, N. meyeri and "Smilosuchus" lithodendrorum, aiming to determine whether microwear texture differences reflect dietary differences between phytosaur species, is published by Bestwick et al. (2020).

Other reptiles

New taxa

Research
 A study on fracture planes (unossified regions in the middle of vertebral centra) in tail vertebrae of mesosaurs is published by MacDougall et al. (2020), who argue that mesosaurs were theoretically capable of tail autotomy, but probably did not utilize this ability.
 A study on patterns of tooth development and replacement in Belebey and Bolosaurus, indicating that bolosaurid teeth had thecodont implantation with deep roots, is published by Snyder et al. (2020).
 Revision of Pachypes‐like footprints from the Cisuralian–Guadalupian of Europe and North America is published by Marchetti et al. (2020), who date the earliest known occurrence of Pachypes to the Artinskian, interpret the footprints belonging to the ichnospecies Pachypes ollieri as produced by nycteroleter pareiasauromorphs, and argue that the earliest occurrences of pareiasauromorph footprints precede the earliest occurrence of this group in the skeletal record by at least 10 million years.
 A study on the dental wear along the tooth rows of nearly one hundred jaws of Captorhinus aguti, indicating that this reptile preferred to feed using the right side of the jaw, is published by Reisz et al. (2020).
 Redescription of Cargninia enigmatica is published by Vivar et al. (2020).
 A study on the phylogenetic relationships and evolutionary history of sphenodontian reptiles is published by Simões, Caldwell & Pierce (2020).
 A study on the feeding mechanics and ecology of Clevosaurus hudsoni and C. cambrica, as indicated by their bite force, resistance of skull bones to bending and torsion, and the distribution of stresses in the jaws during biting, is published by Chambi‐Trowell et al. (2020).
 A study on the anatomy and phylogenetic relationships of Colobops noviportensis is published by Scheyer et al. (2020), who reinterpret this taxon as a probable rhynchocephalian.
 A study on the morphology of teeth of Priosphenodon avelasi is published by LeBlanc et al. (2020).
 Partial skeleton of a small reptile, probably a juvenile specimen of Eusaurosphargis dalsassoi, is described from the Anisian Buchenstein Formation (northern Dolomites, Italy) by Renesto, Kustatscher & Gianolla (2020), who interpret this finding as possible evidence of that the lands emerged near the basins of the northern Dolomites, Besano Formation and Prosanto Formation had a similar reptilian fauna during the middle-late Anisian.
 Fossil tracks possibly produced by a monjurosuchid-like choristoderan are described from the Albian Daegu Formation (South Korea) by Lee, Kong & Jung (2020), who attempt to determine the trackmaker’s locomotory posture on land, and name a new ichnotaxon Novapes ulsanensis.
 A study on the anatomy of the skull of Champsosaurus lindoei is published by Dudgeon et al. (2020), who evaluate the morphology of a putative neomorphic bone in the skull and its possible developmental and functional origins.
 A study on the internal anatomy of the skull of Champsosaurus lindoei and C. natator, and on their probable sensory abilities, is published by Dudgeon et al. (2020).
 A study on the Triassic fossil record and evolution of non-archosaurian archosauromorph reptiles in South America is published by Ezcurra et al. (2020), who also identify the first record of the family Proterosuchidae from South America (partial braincase from the Buena Vista Formation, Uruguay).
 New fossil material of tanystropheid and azendohsaurid archosauromorphs, providing new information on the diversity of Late Triassic archosauromorph reptiles in North America, is described from the Lamy Quarry south of the town of Lamy (Garita Creek Formation; New Mexico, United States) by Hégron et al. (2020).
 Redescription of the anatomy of the skeleton of Macrocnemus fuyuanensis is published by Scheyer et al. (2020).
 Description of the morphology of the skull of Macrocnemus bassanii is published by Miedema et al. (2020).
 A study on the morphology of the skull of Tanystropheus hydroides is published by Spiekman et al. (2020).
 A study on bone histology of three archosauromorph reptiles (Lagerpeton chanarensis, Tropidosuchus romeri and Chanaresuchus bonapartei) from the Triassic Chañares Formation (Argentina), evaluating its implications for the knowledge of the paleobiology of these taxa, is published by Marsà, Agnolín & Novas (2020).

Reptiles in general
 A study on the dynamics of phenotypic and molecular evolution of reptiles during the early diversification of the major lineages of diapsid reptiles in the Permian and Triassic periods, and during the evolution of lepidosaurs from the Jurassic to the present, is published by Simões et al. (2020).
 A large, soft-shelled egg, most closely resembling eggs of extant lizards and snakes and possibly produced by a mosasaur, is described from the Upper Cretaceous Lopez de Bertodano Formation (Antarctica) by Legendre et al. (2020), who name a new ootaxon Antarcticoolithus bradyi.
 A study on the ecological diversity of Mesozoic marine tetrapods is published by Reeves et al. (2020).
 Diverse marine reptile faunas, including taxa previously known nearly exclusively from coeval strata of Europe (such as Temnodontosaurus, Stenopterygius, microcleidids, rhomaleosaurids and basal pliosaurids), are described from the Lower Jurassic Series (Pliensbachian and Toarcian stages) of Eastern Siberia (Russia) by Zverkov, Grigoriev & Danilov (2020).
 A study on the evolution of the archosauromorph ankle, aiming to test the hypothesis of fusion between the centrale and astragalus and the alternative hypothesis of a complete loss of the centrale, based on embryological and palaeontological data, is published by Blanco, Ezcurra & Bona (2020).

References

2020 in paleontology